Brentsville District High School, commonly known as Brentsville, is a public high school in Nokesville  in unincorporated Prince William County, Virginia, United States, and part of Prince William County Public Schools.  It is the only high school in Prince William County considered to be in a developing rural community.

History
Brentsville District High officially opened on September 5, 1929, and hosted grades one through eleven.  From 1929 to 1964, Brentsville existed in the building that currently exists as Nokesville Elementary School. In 1965, the school moved to its new building located on Aden road, and over the years additions were made to the building's structure, with the most recent being a new gymnasium building, with the old space becoming the school's current library.

In 2002, the campus ceased to function in its tandem role as middle and high school, instead becoming exclusively a high school facility. Before this point, the school was district more for students living in the Nokesville, Virginia area. Now the school is district for the Nokesville and Bristow, Virginia areas. Despite this growth, Brentsville is the smallest high school in Prince William County. Remodeling plans for 2006 included the refitting of the auditorium, adding more comfortable seats, bowing the stage, and replacing a sound panel wall.

Demographics

In the 2020-2021 school year, Brentsville's student body was:
 14.7% Hispanic
 70.3% White
 5.8% Black/African American
 5.4% Two or More Races
 3.4% Asian
 0.4% American Indian/Alaskan

Academics and programs

Brenstville District High School offers its students the opportunity to enroll in The Cambridge Programme and to take  Cambridge University's international examinations both toward individual subject certificates as well as work towards and AICE certificate.

The school was a 2004 recipient of the Blue Ribbon Academic School award.  Brentsville District High School remains the only Virginia high school to ever achieve this status. As of the 2011-2012 school year, 86% of the students continue onto high education.

The school grades its students using the Prince William County grading system and grades using academic quarters.

Principals and school leadership

Extracurricular programs

As of 2014, there are 33 student groups considered official extracurricular programs at Brentsville District High School.  These include academic, language, and religious groups.  Groups such as the Future Farmers of America and the Future Business Leaders of America have been historically significant in reflecting the culture at the high school.

Athletics

The athletic teams of Brentsville District High School (during the regular season) compete in the AA Evergreen District and Region II for which the governing body is the Virginia High School League.  Brentsville is, as of 2015, one of the smallest schools to compete in Group 3A athletics. For post-season purposes, Brentsville is assigned to Conference 28 as it is a Group 3A school in the eastern region. Before the 2004 academic year, Brentsville competed in the A Bull Run District.  Brentsville's official mascot for all sporting events is the tiger, the school colors are black and orange.  The high school athletic program has historically performed well in its wrestling and cross country programs and surprised with outstanding seasons in multiple sports over the years, several times resulting in unexpected state championships. While the football team has never been awarded a state championship, they have made it to the state tournament in recent years.

The high school has received academic awards including being ranked as the Sports Illustrated Magazine top athletic school in Virginia in 2005 for the 1995-2005 period.  The school also received the Wachovia Cup, now known as the Wells Fargo Cup, in 2001, 2002, and 2003.

Many great athletes have gone through the athletic programs at Brentsville District High School and continued on to play for college programs across the country.

Brentsville District High School competitive teams and state championships:

References

External links 
 Official website
 Prince William County Public Schools

Educational institutions established in 1929
Public high schools in Virginia
Schools in Prince William County, Virginia
1929 establishments in Virginia